Elections in Australia take place periodically to elect the legislature of the Commonwealth of Australia, as well as for each Australian state and territory and for local government councils. Elections in all jurisdictions follow similar principles, although there are minor variations between them. The elections for the Australian Parliament are held under the federal electoral system, which is uniform throughout the country, and the elections for state and territory Parliaments are held under the electoral system of each state and territory.

Part IV of Chapter 1 of the Australian Constitution briefly deals with eligibility for voting and election to the federal Australian Parliament. It does not prescribe how elections should be conducted. Election campaigns and associated political advertisements are subject to some regulation. Public funding of political parties and party registration was introduced in 1983.

Voting for the federal and each state and territory parliament is compulsory for Australian citizens over the age of 18. Voting is almost entirely conducted using paper ballots. The informal vote is not usually significant, but a donkey vote is more common, and may have a deciding impact in marginal seats.

Parliaments
Voting for the federal and each state and territory parliament is compulsory for Australian citizens over the age of 18.

Federal Parliament

The Australian Parliament consists of two chambers, the House of Representatives (commonly also referred as the lower house) and the Senate (also referred as the upper house). The House of Representatives has 151 members, elected for a maximum term of three years in single-member constituencies (each approximately equal in voters). Elections are conducted by a system of preferential voting (also called alternative voting or instant-runoff voting).

The Senate has 76 senators, elected through a preferential system of proportional representation with a system of single transferable vote, with each state constituting a single constituency normally returning 6 senators every three years and each territory constituting a single constituency returning two senators. Electors in the two territories elect senators for non-fixed terms that are defined by the term of the House of Representatives. State senators normally serve fixed six-year terms, with half of the seats in each State expiring every three years. In the event of a double dissolution, the terms of all the members of the Senate and the House of Representatives seats end immediately.

State Parliaments and Territory Legislative Assemblies

South Australia 
The Parliament of South Australia is a bicameral legislature. The House of Assembly (lower house) comprises 47 members elected by preferential voting every 4 years from single member electorates. The Legislative Council (upper house) comprises 22 members elected by proportional representation of single transferable vote every 8 years.

Queensland 
The Parliament of Queensland is unicameral, consisting of the Legislative Assembly of 93 members elected for a 4 year term from single member electorates using fully preferential voting.

Western Australia 
The Parliament of Western Australia consists of the Legislative Assembly and the Legislative Council. The Legislative Assembly has 57 members elected for a four-year term, unless dissolved earlier, from single member electorates using fully preferential voting. The Legislative Council has 37 members elected for a fixed term of 4 years, in a 'whole of state' electorate using preferential proportional representation.

Electoral Commissions

Elections in Australia (Commonwealth, State or Territory) are organised by their respective electoral commissions, as follows:

The Australian Electoral Commission (AEC) is the federal government agency responsible for organising, conducting and supervising federal elections, by-elections and referendums. The AEC is also responsible for setting electoral boundaries and redistributions, and maintains the Commonwealth electoral roll. State and Territory Electoral Commissions perform an equivalent role for State and Territory elections. The Australian electoral roll is also used by the state and territory Electoral Commissions to conduct State, Territory and local government elections, except Western Australia which maintains its own electoral roll.

Voter enrollment 
Enrolment on the electoral roll, known in some other countries as registration, is compulsory for all Australian citizens aged 18 years and over. Residents in Australia who had been enrolled as British subjects on 25 January 1984 continue to be enrolled and vote. (Almost 163,000 voters were recorded as British subjects on the electoral roll in 2009.)

Since 1984, eligible people have had seven days after a federal election is called to enrol or update address details. For the 2007 federal election, the deadline for new enrolments was reduced to 8 pm on the same business day as the issue of the writs, and 8 pm on the third business day to update address details. The deadline for enrolment is taken with reference to the date an election is called and not the actual election date, and a person not enrolled by the deadline cannot vote. Enrolment can be done online or by completing a form and sending it using regular mail, which must arrive by the deadline.

Election day
Each jurisdiction has its own laws and customs as to when elections in the jurisdiction will take place. However, state and territory elections cannot, by federal law, take place within a week before or after a federal election.

Since 1912, federal elections have been held on Saturdays.

Although elections for the House of Representatives have usually corresponded to half-elections of the Senate, the rules which determine when the elections occur differ. Under the Constitution, the House of Representatives lasts no more than three years after it first meets, but may be dissolved earlier. After the House is dissolved or expires, writs for election must be issued within 10 days and the election must be held on a Saturday between 33 and 58 days after the writs have been issued. The next House must meet within 140 days of the writs being issued.

The terms of senators representing the states are of fixed duration (unless Parliament is dissolved in a double dissolution), and elections must occur within a year before the term expires. The terms of senators representing the territories are not fixed, and are tied to the dates of elections for the House of Representatives. Where a House is dissolved early, House and Senate elections may be asynchronous until either the House is again dissolved sufficiently early or a double dissolution occurs.

The Australian Constitution requires that in half-Senate elections the election of State senators must take place within one year before the places become vacant. As the terms of half the senators end on 30 June, the writs for a half-Senate election cannot be issued earlier than the previous 1 July. There is no constitutional requirement for simultaneous elections for the Senate and the House of Representatives, and elections for half the Senate only have taken place in the past. There is a government and electorate preference for Senate elections to take place simultaneously with those of the House of Representatives. Except in the case of a double dissolution, the Senate is not dissolved when elections for the Senate are called and can continue to sit until the term expires. However, it is now a practice for the Senate to be prorogued when the House is dissolved, so that it does not sit during the election period.

By Westminster convention, the decision as to the type of election and date on which an election is to take place is that of the Prime Minister, who 'advises' the Governor-General to set the process in motion by dissolving the House of Representatives (if it has not expired) and then issuing writs for election.

Writs for the election of House of Representatives and territory senators are issued by the Governor-General, while writs for the election of state senators are issued by the respective state governors.

Voting

Voting in federal, state and territory elections is compulsory for all persons on the electoral roll. Voting can take place by a person attending in person at any polling place in their State on the election day or in early voting locations, or by applying for and mailing in a postal vote. Absentee voting is also available, but not proxy voting.

At the 2007 federal election there were 7,723 polling places open for voting. In remote areas, mobile polling places have been used since the 1980s. The visually impaired can use electronic voting machines.

Voting is almost entirely conducted by paper ballot. If more than one election takes place at the same time (for example, for the House of Representatives and the Senate), separate ballot papers are used. These are usually of different colours and are deposited into separate boxes.

How-to-vote cards are usually handed out at polling places by party volunteers. They suggest how a party supporter might vote for other candidates or parties. Electors now routinely receive how-to-vote materials through the mail or by other means.

In practice, privacy arrangements allow informal and protest votes to take place. At the 2010 federal election more than 1.5 million people did not vote or voted incorrectly. Academic Brian Costar from Swinburne University claims the rate of donkey votes in Australia is around 2% of all votes, but the figure is hard to determine accurately.

Most polling places are schools, community halls or churches. Supporters of these places very commonly take advantage of the large number of visitors undertaking fund raising activity, often including raffles, cake stalls and sales of democracy sausages.

Parties

Political parties have certain benefits in Australia's electoral system, including public funding. Political parties must register with the electoral commission in the jurisdiction in which it is proposing to field or endorse candidates. To be eligible for federal registration a party must have at least one member in the Australian Parliament or 1,500 members, and independent candidates are required to provide 50 signatures to be eligible to stand. An unsuccessful challenge to the 500 member requirement was heard by the High Court of Australia in 2004. Other Australian jurisdictions require political parties to have a minimum number of members. For example, New South Wales requires at least 750 members while the ACT and the Northern Territory require 100 members. There are deadlines for registration of a political party.

Australia has a de facto two-party system, with the Australian Labor Party and the Coalition of the Liberal Party of Australia, National Party of Australia, the Liberal National Party and Country Liberal Party dominating Parliamentary elections. It is very difficult for other parties to win representation in the House, let alone form the government, though they may have a strong influence if they hold the "balance of power". However, minor parties and independent candidates have been elected to the Senate by virtue of its more favourable voting system. In recent decades, several parties besides the ALP and the Coalition have secured significant representation in the Senate, notably the DLP (1955–1974); the Australian Democrats (1977–2007); and the Australian Greens and its predecessors (1990–present). Independent and other individual senators have also exercised influence, e.g., Brian Harradine (1975–2005), Family First's Steve Fielding (2005–2011), and Nick Xenophon (2008–2017); and, variously from 1984, representatives of the Nuclear Disarmament Party and One Nation.

Many voters use elections to reaffirm their party allegiance. Party affiliation has declined in recent decades. Voters who voted for the same party each election made up 72% of the electorate in 1967. This figure had declined to 45% by 2007. Minor parties have played a greater role in the politics of Australia since proportional representation was progressively introduced.

Elections in Australia are seen by parties as a chance to develop and refine policies. Rather than a procedure where the best policies win the day, elections are contests where parties fight for power. Elections are not part of the process in which specific decisions on policy are made. Control of policy and platforms are wholly determined within the party.

Candidate selection, in Australia typically called preselection, is a significant factor in the democratic process in Australia because the majority of voters base their decision at election time on the party rather than the candidate. In Australia the decision of who may be a candidate is decided by the party in any manner they choose. It can range from a postal vote to the whole party membership through to a decision made by a small select committee.

Election campaigns

Election campaigns typically involve a televised policy launch, which, despite the name, have increasingly been held towards the end of the campaign.  In the 2013 federal election campaign, for example, the Liberal/National and Labor launches were held only 13 days and 6 days respectively prior to election day. From the 1980s onwards direct mailing was seen as a successful way to market, particularly in marginal seats. Major political parties in Australia use databases created from census data, voting records and their own canvassing to shape their direct mail. Quantitative surveys of samples from the wide population as well as focus groups are used by the parties for market research during election campaigns.

The Commonwealth Electoral Act 1918 stipulates that political advertisements display the name and address of the individual authorising them. The Broadcasting Services Act 1922 bans the broadcast of advertisements in the three days prior to an election. A ban on broadcast election advertising was imposed under the Political Broadcasts and Political Disclosures Act 1991 but was overturned by the High Court of Australia in 1992. Party registration rules have become stricter, especially in New South Wales.

Television is the preferred medium for campaign news in Australia. At the 2004 federal election more than three-quarters of money spent on advertising was television based.

Incumbent candidates and government have significant benefits compared to non-incumbents. These include substantial allowances and access to staff whose travel is covered by parliamentary allowances.

The Australian Election Study coordinated by the Australian National University was introduced in 1987. The series of surveys are conducted post election and provide a unique take on political behaviour during election campaigns.

Public funding

Australia's first partial public election funding was introduced in 1981 by the then Premier of New South Wales Neville Wran. The Commonwealth Electoral Legislation Amendment Act 1983 brought forward by the Hawke Government introduced public election funding and the requirement that all minor donations to parties be disclosed. Amendments to legislation were needed due to the changing nature of election campaigns in the late 1960s and 1970s. Opinion polling, widespread advertising and the rise of the hired campaign professionals meant campaigning had become far more expensive than in previous decades.

Public funding is the preferred means to cover costs rather than corporate donations. However, the majority of the major parties funding is still sourced from private donors. If a candidate or party receives at least 4% of the primary vote at a federal election they are eligible for public funding. The amount of funding paid is calculated by multiplying the number of first preference votes received by the rate of payment at that time, which is indexed in line with the Consumer Price Index.  It is possible for a candidate to receive more public funding than what was spent on campaigning as was the case in Pauline Hanson's 2004 attempt to win a seat in the Australian Senate.

In Queensland, the threshold for public funding is 6% of the primary vote. The threshold in Victoria, Western Australia and the Australian Capital Territory is 4%. South Australia, Tasmania and the Northern Territory do not have public funding for parties and candidates at elections.

Caretaker convention

A series of conventions has evolved covering the conduct of the business of government by ministers, their departments of state, and the Public Service during the "caretaker period" of the election. This period begins after the announcement of the election date, when the Governor-General of Australia dissolves the federal parliament on advice from the Prime Minister. It ends after the election result is known and clear, when a newly elected government is sworn into office.

Federal lower house primary, two-party and seat results
A two-party system has existed in the Australian House of Representatives since the two non-Labor parties merged in 1909. The 1910 election was the first to elect a majority government, with the Australian Labor Party concurrently winning the first Senate majority. Prior to 1909 a three-party system existed in the chamber. A two-party-preferred vote (2PP) has been calculated since the 1919 change from first-past-the-post to preferential voting and subsequent introduction of the Coalition. ALP = Australian Labor Party, L+NP = grouping of Liberal/National/LNP/CLP Coalition parties (and predecessors), Oth = other parties and independents.

See also

Electoral system of Australia
Electoral systems of the Australian states and territories
 List of Australian federal elections
 List of Australian federal by-elections

References

External links

Australian Electoral Study
Adam Carr's Election Archive
Archived websites from Australian electoral campaigns since 1996
Guidance on Caretaker ConventionsDepartment of the Prime Minister and Cabinet (Australia)
Australian Politics and Elections Database (University of Western Australia)
 Full text (HTML) file of the Constitution. From the Parliament of Australia web site.

 

it:Elezioni in Australia
hu:Választások Ausztráliában
fi:Vaalit Australiassa
sv:Val i Australien
cs:Volby v Austrálii